Frank Watts Baker (born October 29, 1946) is a former Major League Baseball shortstop.  Baker attended school at the University of Southern Mississippi and was drafted by the New York Yankees in the 2nd round of the 1967 MLB draft.

Baker played 146 career games with the Yankees and Baltimore Orioles, with 55 hits and a .191 average.

Baker was battling cancer as of November 2018.

References

External links

1946 births
Major League Baseball shortstops
Baseball players from Mississippi
Sportspeople from Meridian, Mississippi
New York Yankees players
Baltimore Orioles players
Syracuse Chiefs players
Fort Lauderdale Yankees players
Kinston Eagles players
Living people
Southern Miss Golden Eagles baseball players